Kenshi is a role-playing video game developed and published by Lo-Fi Games for Windows. The game focuses on sandbox gameplay features that give the player freedom to do what they want in its world instead of focusing on a linear story. Kenshi development was primarily led by a single person over the course of twelve years, and it was released on December 6, 2018.

Kenshi takes place in a post-apocalyptic setting and allows the player to freely customize all facets of their characters' personality and role in the game world. The game has received mostly positive reviews from critics, who have commented on its depth and difficulty.

Gameplay

Kenshi is an open world role-playing video game with real-time strategy elements that has no linear narrative. It takes place in a post-apocalyptic setting, where it is incredibly difficult for life to survive. The player starts out with no skills and struggles to survive in the early stages of the game. Skills are leveled up through doing actions, such as leveling up thievery by stealing items, various combat skills by fighting, and the player can recruit other units to grow their squad. The player can recruit characters from numerous different factions and species to join their squad, and can eventually build a town themselves. As part of the damage system, limbs can be severed or damaged individually, with the option to replace them with prosthetic limbs if available. Kenshi has many non-player locations, of sizes ranging from a single building to large cities. The game includes a world states system which creates reactions to deaths of notable people. These reactions to power vacuums can result in new locations spawning or in towns being taken over by new factions. Zones in Kenshi are not just aesthetic, as they have specific qualities, such as soil types, terrain, and resource availability. These factors come into play when players are constructing outposts. Weather is a constant concern whether or not the player decides to construct an outpost, with some types (such as acid rain) causing ill effects.

Development
Kenshi was primarily developed by a single person, Chris Hunt, who began development around 2006–2008. Hunt worked as a part-time security guard in order to make ends meet for the first few years of the game's development. After five or so years of working his security job, Hunt was able to leave his part-time job and work on the game full-time after finding initial success with the game. He worked by himself on the project until 2013, when he was able to hire a small team that helped him with the project. Hunt has described the world as "sword-punk", and was specifically inspired by stories of wandering rōnin and the idea of a survivor travelling a wasteland.

Hunt has described his impetus for creating the game as his dislike of the "hand-holding" that other RPGs have when starting out. On his general mantra for designing the game, Hunt stated that he considered himself as the player's enemy. Hunt wanted different areas of the map to have different themes or factions that would make them feel unique, such as one that treats female characters differently than males.

The game was released in early access in 2013 before its full release on December 6, 2018.

Reception

Kenshi received "generally favorable reviews", according to review aggregator Metacritic. PC Gamer Robert Zak praised the game's giant size and scope, but noted that the game could get "grindy" and that the game's UI "can get cumbersome as your group's numbers grow." Rock, Paper, Shotgun noted the game's depth and compared Kenshi positively to Dwarf Fortress.

Sequel
In March 2019, a prequel built on the Unreal Engine, Kenshi 2, was announced.

References

External links

2018 video games
Fantasy video games
Indie video games
Open-world video games
Post-apocalyptic video games
Role-playing video games
Single-player video games
Video games developed in the United Kingdom
Windows games
Windows-only games
Science fiction video games